The Mauboussin M.120 was a trainer and touring aircraft built in France in the 1930s and again in the years following World War II.

Design and production

It was based on a 1931 Peyret-Mauboussin collaboration between Louis Peyret and Pierre Mauboussin, the Peyret-Mauboussin PM.XII, and like it, was a low-wing cantilever monoplane of wooden construction. The undercarriage was of fixed tailskid type, and the pilot and instructor sat in tandem, open cockpits. Mauboussin built a number of prototypes himself, followed by a small series manufactured for him by Breguet in 1934.

At one stage Mauboussins were produced by the Société Zodiac.

In 1936, Fouga, then a builder of railway rolling stock, purchased all rights to the design as part of an effort to enter the aircraft industry and was able to secure a contract from the Armée de l'Air to supply the type as the M.123.

Production was restarted by Fouga after the war for the French flying clubs.

Operations

One of first M.120s took part in the international touring aircraft contest Challenge 1932, flown by André Nicolle. It completed contest on the last 24th place, but it had the weakest engine of all participants and completing this contest was quite a success anyway. Two competed the following year, one of them with an all-women crew for probably the first time. Again, low engine power left them low in the final table.

Variants

M.120original design with  Salmson 9Adr engine
M.120/32examples built by Mauboussin (3 built)
M.120/34examples built by Breguet (10 built)
M.120/37
M.121as M.120 but with supercharged Salmson 9A 
M.121P Corsaire Majorversion with Pobjoy Cataract engine (4 built)
M.122 Corsaire Majorversion with Salmson 9Aers engine for Maryse Hilsz (1 built)
M.123major production version with Salmson 9Adr engine (65 built)
M.123C Continental A65 engine
M.123M  Minié engine.
M.123R  Régnier engine.
M.123T  Train engine.
Metalair 1 a derivative of the M.123
Grenet PG-2 Bison
M.124first postwar version with Aster 4A engine (1 built)
M.125version with Régnier 4Jo engine (5 built)
M.126version with Salmson 5Ap engine (1 built)
M.127version with Régnier 4Eo engine (2 built)
M.128version with Mathis G4R engine (1 built)
M.129pre-war version with Minié 4.DA 25 engine 
M.129/48definitive postwar version with Minié 4.DA 28 engine (23 built)
 Mauboussin-Zodiac 17Designation for Zodiac produced M.120 aircraft

Operators

French Air Force

Specifications (M.123)

References

 
 
 
 aviafrance.com
 M-120 Corsaire at Уголок неба

External links

 Photos at aviafrance.com
 Photos and drawings at Уголок неба

Mauboussin aircraft
1930s French civil trainer aircraft
1930s French sport aircraft
Single-engined tractor aircraft
Low-wing aircraft
Aircraft first flown in 1932